The Greatest Expectation is a 2003 South Korean romantic comedy film.

Plot
Chang-sik (Im Chang-jung) lives strictly by the freeloader's handbook, doing the rounds of free samples in department store food sections and sponging off of his older brother. Mi-young (Kim Sun-a) nurtures grandiose dreams of becoming a TV actress but has failed every audition because she just can't act. Because the two are unemployed, live in the same neighborhood, and have similar schedules, they are bound to run into each other, and they do. One day, Chang-sik and Mi-young are walking around distractedly when they end up in a head-on collision. Chang-sik's coins spill out from his hands and scatter all over the ground. His precious coins! He chases after every single one but ends up 10 cents short. He viciously turns to the Mi-young but she refuses to give him 10 cents.

They become sworn enemies after this incident, but then come across the chance of a lifetime. By chance, they witness a hit-and-run involving old man Hwang together. The next day, to their amazement, they see a banner advertising a  reward to eyewitnesses. Of course, each person eagerly offers to be a witness and ends up getting tangled up in something they hadn't bargained for. What have these two slackers gotten themselves into?

References

External links 
 
 
 

2003 films
2000s Korean-language films
South Korean romantic comedy films
2003 romantic comedy films
2000s South Korean films